Wilaru is an extinct genus of bird of uncertain phylogenetic placement from the Late Oligocene to Early Miocene of Australia. It was originally classified as a stone-curlew, but subsequently it was argued to be a member of the extinct family Presbyornithidae instead. It is either the oldest known burhinid or the youngest known presbyornithid. The type species is Wilaru tedfordi; genus also includes the second species Wilaru prideauxi. The type species was described from fossil material collected from Lake Pinpa, Lake Palankarinna and Billeroo Creek, in the Lake Eyre Basin of north-eastern South Australia. The genus name Wilaru is the term for “stone curlew” in the Diyari language of the Lake Eyre region. The specific epithet of the type species honours American palaeontologist Richard H. Tedford (1929–2011) of the American Museum of Natural History, who led the 1971 expedition to Lake Pinpa during which much of the descriptive material was collected.

Description and ecology

Compared to other presbyornithids, Willaru appeared to have been specialised to a more terrestrial lifestyle, based on its tarsometatarsal morphology. In particular, the latter W. prideauxi appears to have been more specialised towards terrestriality than the earlier W. tedfordi, being larger and more robust, indicating a clear speciation towards this lifestyle and therefore a direct species sequence.

Like many modern waterfowl, the Willaru species had spurs and knobs on their carpals. Like the closely related modern-day screamers, these were almost certainly used to fight, indicating perhaps territorial habits, as opposed to the more gregarious nature of earlier presbyornithids.

Willaru co-existed with several anatid and anseranatid species, indicating that there was little ecological competition. It is possible that a speciation towards terrestriality might have spared it from competition with more derived waterfowl, allowing it to live longer than other presbyornithids.

References

Fossil taxa described in 2013
Birds described in 2013
Oligocene birds
Miocene birds
Prehistoric birds of Australia
Presbyornithidae